Harvest Moon DS: Island of Happiness, known simply as Harvest Moon: Island of Happiness, and known in Japan as , is a farm simulation video game published and developed by Marvelous Interactive Inc. in Japan, and released in North America by Natsume exclusively for the Nintendo DS. It is the third installment of the Story of Seasons series on the DS. It is the first entry without series creator Yasuhiro Wada involved.

Harvest Moon DS: Island of Happiness is the second time that the series has branched a protagonist in an ongoing story, as the game no longer taking place in the previous continuity. Alongside its sequel, Harvest Moon DS: Sunshine Islands, they both follow the new protagonists Mark and Chelsea. Prior entries before Harvest Moon DS: Island of Happiness were all interconnected to a central story of descendants that all carried over the family farm.

Gameplay

Animals
Livestock includes cows, chickens, and sheep, which produce milk, eggs, and wool respectively. Work animals include a dog and horse, which can be acquired after meeting certain criteria. The dog protects livestock, and the horse can be ridden and used for farm work.

Marriage
As in other games in the Harvest Moon series, Island of Happiness offers players a chance to marry. Marriage is only possible once you have met everyone in the game. If playing as a boy, there are six bachelorettes to choose from: Natalie, Witch Princess, Julia, Lanna, Sabrina, and Chelsea. Playing as a girl, there are also six eligible bachelors: Vaughn, Denny, Shea, Pierre, Elliot, and Mark. The couple can also have a child, after a month of marriage. This child progresses only so far as to begin to crawl, toddle, and speak.

Story
In the beginning, the player (playing either as the male character, Mark, or the female character, Chelsea) is shipwrecked with a family of four and end up on a deserted island. There seems to be signs of past life on the island, but no one knows what happened. By farming, the player will attract new villagers (much like Harvest Moon: Magical Melody), who provide ranching or agricultural services.

Development 
The American pre-order bonus was a limited edition plush chicken that was included with the game when ordered from participating retailers.

Reception

The game received "mixed" reviews according to the review aggregation website Metacritic. In Japan, Famitsu gave it all four sevens for a total of 28 out of 40.

In Australia, Tracey Lien of Hyper commended the game for bringing "back the addictive elements from previous games." However, she criticized the "clumsy control system that makes even the most basic of tasks feel like a chore."

References

External links
  
 Official North American press release
 

2007 video games
Story of Seasons games
Marvelous Entertainment
Nintendo DS games
Nintendo DS-only games
Nintendo Wi-Fi Connection games
Simulation video games
Ubisoft games
Video games developed in Japan
Video games featuring protagonists of selectable gender
Video games set on uninhabited islands
Rising Star Games games
Single-player video games